Thakurbaba (earlier:Babai municipality) is a municipality located in Bardiya District in the Lumbini Province of Nepal. It is one out of six municipalities of Bardiya District. The municipality is surrounded by Bardiya National Park from the east, west and north, and Madhuwan and Barbardiya from the south.

The municipality is divided into a total of 9 wards.

Background
The municipality was established on 19 September 2015, when the government announced 26 more new municipalities. This new municipality was established merging the two then VDCs, e.g. Neulapur and Baganaha and this new municipality was named Babai, later on 10 March 2017 two more VDCs Sivapur and Thakurdwara Incorporated with this municipality and renamed it to Thakurbaba.

Demographics
At the time of the 2011 Nepal census, Thakurbaba Municipality had a population of 45,173. Of these, 58.1% spoke Tharu, 39.2% Nepali, 0.8% Magar, 0.4% Urdu, 0.3% Assamese, 0.3% Yakkha, 0.2% Newar, 0.2% Hindi, 0.2% Acchami and 0.3% other languages as their first language.

In terms of ethnicity/caste, 58.6% were Tharu, 13.7% Hill Brahmin, 13.3% Chhetri, 4.9% Kami, 2.5% Thakuri, 1.9% Magar, 1.6% Damai/Dholi, 1.1% Sanyasi/Dasnami, 0.6% Musalman and 1.8% others.

In terms of religion, 96.1% were Hindu, 2.3% Christian, 0.9% Buddhist, 0.6% Muslim and 0.1% Kirati.

See also
Bardiya District
Lumbini Province

References

Municipalities in Lumbini Province
Nepal municipalities established in 2015
Municipalities in Bardiya District